WTYN (91.7 FM) is a radio station airing a Christian format licensed to serve Lunenburg, Massachusetts. The station is owned by Horizon Christian Fellowship  and is an affiliate of RenewFM. WTYN's programming consists of Christian music and Christian talk and teaching programs such as Turning Point with David Jeremiah, and Truth for Life with Alistair Begg.  The allocation of 91.7 to Lunenburg follows a long drawn out dispute involving WAVM, University of Massachusetts Boston (owner of WUMB-FM, whose Stow repeater WUMG started during this time and shares time with WAVM), and Living Proof, Inc (the original applicant of what became WTYN).

See also 
 RenewFM

References

External links 
 WTYN's official website

TYN
Mass media in Worcester County, Massachusetts
Radio stations established in 2012